Barberton High School may refer to:

 Barberton High School (Ohio), United States
 Barberton High School, Mpumalanga, South Africa